The West Yorkshire Built-up Area, previously known as the West Yorkshire Urban Area is a term used by the Office for National Statistics (ONS) to refer to a conurbation in West Yorkshire, England, based on the cities of Leeds, Bradford and Wakefield, and the large towns of Huddersfield and Halifax. It is the 4th largest urban area in the United Kingdom. However, it excludes other towns and villages such as Featherstone, Normanton, Castleford, Pontefract, Hemsworth, Todmorden, Hebden Bridge, Knottingley, Wetherby and Garforth which, though part of the county of West Yorkshire are considered independently. There are substantial areas of agricultural land within the designated area – more than in any other official urban area in England – many of the towns and cities are only just connected with one another by narrow outlying strips of development.

Urban subdivisions

 

 
The ONS gives the conurbation a population of 1,777,934 (2011 census), which makes it the fourth-most populous in the UK. The ONS partitions the area down into 39 sub-divisions:

Three further subdivisions are given with no population numbers as they are present or former industrial areas with no resident population.

Rawdon is the subdivision name for Horsforth Vale, on which a former industrial plant was redeveloped for housing from 2010, too late to be recorded for the 2011 census.

Brookfoot Quarry (Marshalls Southowram)
Esholt Water Treatment plant, named 'Works, nr Bradford' by the ONS
Rawdon

Note that the areas below do not have exactly the same borders in each census, so the numbers are not always comparable (e.g. what was classified as Lofthouse/Stanley in 2001 was classified as part of Wakefield in 2011).

References

Urban areas of England
Geography of West Yorkshire